Megarry is a surname. Notable people with the surname include: 

David R. Megarry, American game designer
Robert Megarry (1910–2006), British lawyer and judge
Roy Megarry (born 1937), Canadian businessman
Thomas Megarry (1898–1985), Hong Kong civil servant